Lyla Lerrol is a fictional character appearing in American comic books published by DC Comics. She first appeared in the Superman daily newspaper strip August 27, 1960 before her comics debut in Superman #141, publication date September 15, 1960. She is one of the many Superman characters with the initials "LL" (others include Lois Lane, Lex Luthor, Lori Lemaris, and Lana Lang).

Pre-Crisis version
In the story "Superman's Return to Krypton!", Lyla Lerrol is introduced as the most famous actress on Krypton. Superman meets her after he accidentally breaks the time barrier and becomes stranded on Krypton shortly before its destruction. While attempting to aid his father Jor-El in his effort to develop a rocket ship, he accidentally meets Lyla. The two immediately feel an attraction to each other, one which quickly grows into love after Superman saves Lyla when their rocket goes out of control.

Resigned to being stranded on Krypton, Superman is prepared to marry Lyla when fate intervenes again. While working on the set of one of Lyla's films, Superman becomes trapped inside a full-sized model rocket with a Kryptonian Flame Beast. The force of the Flame Beast's breath acts as a rocket blast and propels the ship away from Krypton. Once he approaches a yellow sun, Superman's powers return. However, he realizes that it is impossible for him to return to Krypton and save Lyla.

Lyla is described as being very beautiful, with blue eyes and blonde hair, but she has also been seen in flashback with black hair.

In Superman #189 (August 1966), Superman meets a robot double of Lyla on Krypton II, a "decoy" planet created by Jor-El as a defense against alien invaders. Lyla makes no other active appearances in the pre-Crisis Superman canon. She would later be revealed to be a clone of Lyla Michaels aka Harbinger, conditioning Superman to greater heights with her influence.

In 1979, the Justice League encountered Lyla on the night before Krypton exploded, and she learned Kal-El's fate (Super Friends #17, February 1979).

In Alan Moore's story "For the Man Who Has Everything" in Superman Annual #11, Superman is attacked by an alien plant called the "Black Mercy", which causes Superman to enter a dream-like state. In his fantasy life, Krypton never exploded, and a grown Kal-El is married to Lyla Lerrol (spelled Ler-Rol in this story).

Post-Crisis version
In the post-Crisis continuity, a version of Lyla appears in the six part story arc Superman: Godfall (2004), written by Joe Kelly and Michael Turner, with art by Talent Caldwell. This Lyla, whose last name is not revealed, is an alien empath to a society that persecuted all aliens, but empaths in particular. Simply being one was to have a death sentence. Her father told her all of the old myths about the Superman as she grew up and she became steeped in the belief of a power greater than her that was guiding her life. Her faith was destroyed when her father was murdered by a Kandorian.

After that, she began to dream of Superman. They were visions that connected her to him. She called to him and he appeared, broken and exhausted. She nursed him back to health and brain-washed him to believe he was a low-level official working for the Kryptonian government and that Krypton had never been destroyed. She made him believe he was nothing more than a nobody in a menial job with no future and no dreams. She infused him with her own frustrations about the futility of existence.

When she was ready, she stole his powers and used his connection to the real world to break out into the Fortress of Solitude. She flew to Metropolis, wanting to have people worship her, only to discover the real truth: Superman wasn't a god at all, people didn't worship him, he'd earned their love and trust but no more.

When Superman and the group of alien Kandor rebels arrive to confront her, she fights back with the powers she stole from him. She stops Preus from killing him but blows both Preus and herself up in an attempt to protect Superman. Her current whereabouts is unknown but Superman believes she survived and will come back one day.

References

Characters created by Jerry Siegel
Comics characters introduced in 1960
DC Comics female characters
Fictional actors
Fictional empaths
Kryptonians
Superman characters